Jhon Baggio Rakotonomenjanahary (born 19 December 1991), simply known as John Baggio in Thailand,
 is a Malagasy professional footballer who plays as an attacking midfielder. He made eight appearances scoring one goal for the Madagascar national team between 2011 and 2015.

Career
Rakotonomenjanahary has played for Academie Ny Antsika, Stade Tamponnaise, Concordia Basel, Old Boys and Sukhothai. In 2021 he signed for Port. After playing for JS Saint-Pierroise, he returned to Sukhothai.

He made his international debut for Madagascar national team in 2011.

Career statistics
Scores and results list Madagascar's goal tally first.

References

1991 births
Living people
Malagasy footballers
Madagascar international footballers
Academie Ny Antsika players
La Tamponnaise players
FC Concordia Basel players
BSC Old Boys players
Baggio Rakotonomenjanahary
Baggio Rakotonomenjanahary
Baggio Rakotonomenjanahary
Association football midfielders
Malagasy expatriate footballers
Malagasy expatriate sportspeople in Réunion
Expatriate footballers in Réunion
Malagasy expatriate sportspeople in Switzerland
Expatriate footballers in Switzerland
Malagasy expatriate sportspeople in Thailand
Expatriate footballers in Thailand
JS Saint-Pierroise players